Lt Col (R) Muhammad Hashim Dogar is a Pakistani politician who had served as Provincial Minister of Punjab for Home and Prisons from 6 August 2022 to 11 October 2022. He had also served as the Provincial Minister of Punjab for Population Welfare from 6 September 2018 to 1 April 2022. He served in the Pakistan Army for 26 years. He served in an infantry battalion and later in the intelligence corps.

He is from Jamsher Kalan, Kanganpur Tehsil Chunain, Kasur.

Political career

He was elected to the Provincial Assembly of the Punjab as a candidate of Pakistan Tehreek-e-Insaf from Constituency PP-177 (Kasur-IV) in 2018 Pakistani general election.

On 27 August 2018, he was inducted into the provincial Punjab cabinet of Chief Minister Sardar Usman Buzdar without any ministerial portfolio. On 6 September 2018, he was appointed as Provincial Minister of Punjab for Population Welfare. He served in this position till the resignation of Chief Minister Usman Buzdar on 1 April 2022.

He was later inducted into the cabinet of Chief Minister Chaudhry Pervaiz Elahi as the Provincial Minister of Punjab for Home and Prisons on 6 August 2022. He resigned from his position on 11 October 2022 due to "personal commitments and some health issues".

References

Living people
Pakistan Tehreek-e-Insaf MPAs (Punjab)
Provincial ministers of Punjab
1969 births